The 2000 WNBA Season was the Women's National Basketball Association's fourth season. The 2000 season saw four expansion teams join the league, the Indiana Fever, Miami Sol, Portland Fire, and Seattle Storm. The season ended with the Houston Comets winning their fourth WNBA championship.

Regular season standings
Eastern Conference

Western Conference

Season award winners

Playoffs

Coaches

Eastern Conference
Charlotte Sting: T.R. Dunn
Cleveland Rockers: Dan Hughes
Detroit Shock: Nancy Lieberman
Indiana Fever: Anne Donovan
Miami Sol: Ron Rothstein
New York Liberty: Richie Adubato
Orlando Miracle: Carolyn Peck
Washington Mystics: Nancy Darsch and Darrell Walker

Western Conference
Houston Comets: Van Chancellor
Los Angeles Sparks: Michael Cooper
Minnesota Lynx: Brian Agler
Phoenix Mercury: Cheryl Miller
Portland Fire: Linda Hargrove
Sacramento Monarchs: Sonny Allen
Seattle Storm: Lin Dunn
Utah Starzz: Fred Williams

External links
2000 WNBA Awards
2000 WNBA Playoffs

 
2000
2000 in American women's basketball
2000–01 in American basketball by league
1999–2000 in American basketball by league